For information on all UC Davis sports, see UC Davis Aggies

The UC Davis Aggies softball team represents the University of California, Davis in NCAA Division I college softball. The team participates in the Big West Conference. The Aggies are currently led by head coach Erin Thorpe. The team plays its home games at La Rue Field located on the university's campus.

Head coaches
Sources:

Year-by-year results
Sources:

Notable players

Conference awards
Big West Pitcher of the Year
Alex Holmes (2010)
Justine Vela (2012)
Brooke Yanez (2019) 

Big West Freshman Player of the Year
Kelly Harman (2009)
Elizabeth Santana (2010)

Big West Freshman Pitcher of the Year
Justine Vela (2012)
Brooke Yanez (2018)

Big West Coach of the Year
Karen Yoder (2010)

See also
List of NCAA Division I softball programs

References

External links